Five Star Christmas is an 2020 American-Canadian made-for-television romantic comedy film directed by Christie Will Wolf, from a screenplay by Alfonso H. Moreno, from a story by Stephen Witkin and Michael Elliot. It stars Bethany Joy Lenz, Victor Webster, Robert Wisden, Laura Soltis, Jay Brazeau and Grace Beedie. It premiered on November 27, 2020, on Hallmark Channel.

Plot
When a travel writer unexpectedly shows up at their family's bed and breakfast, the Ralston family pretends to be guests in hopes of a good review, Lucy falls for guest Jake.

Cast
 Bethany Joy Lenz as Lucy Ralston 
 Victor Webster as Jake
 Robert Wisden as Ted Ralston 
 Laura Soltis as Beth
 Jay Brazeau as Walter Ralston
 Grace Beedie as Amber Ralston 
 Barbara Patrick as Suzanne Ralston
 Blair Penner as Will Ralston
 Sarah Edmondson as Annie Ralston
 Tom Pickett as Mr. Donahue 
 Paula Shaw as Margo

Production
Principal photography began in October 2020, in Vancouver, Canada.

Release
It premiered on November 27, 2020, on Hallmark Channel.

References

External links
 

2020 television films
American Christmas films
Canadian Christmas films
Christmas television films
English-language Canadian films
Hallmark Channel original films
2020 films
2020 romantic comedy films